J.P. Śliwa – third solo album by Polish rock singer Piotr Rogucki, frontman of the band Coma. It was released on October 16, 2015 through Polish label Agora.
The album debuted at number 8 on the official Polish sales chart OLiS.

Track listing

Charts

References

2015 albums
Piotr Rogucki albums
Polish-language albums